Graphium gelon is a butterfly of the family Papilionidae. It is found in New Caledonia and the nearby Loyalty Islands.

See also
List of butterflies of New Caledonia
Biodiversity of New Caledonia

References

  Presents a key to the closely related Graphium kosii , Graphium weiskei (Ribbe), G.stresemanni (Rothschild), G. batjanensis Okano, G. macleayanum (Leach) and G. gelon (Boisduval) all of which are confined to the Australasian region.

gelon
Butterflies of Oceania
Insects of New Caledonia
Endemic fauna of New Caledonia
Butterflies described in 1859
Taxa named by Jean Baptiste Boisduval